Palicourea gentryi is a species of plant in the family Rubiaceae. It is endemic to Ecuador.

References

Flora of Ecuador
gentryi
Vulnerable plants
Taxonomy articles created by Polbot